The 2021 STCC TCR Scandinavia Touring Car Championship was the eleventh overall season of the Scandinavian Touring Car Championship and the fifth under the internationally recognised TCR formula. It is also the fourth time the championship is run under the STCC TCR Scandinavia Touring Car Championship banner. The season started on 4 June at Ljungbyheds Motorbana and ended on 9 October at Ring Knutstorp after six rounds.

Teams and drivers 

Notes:

Race calendar and results

Championship standings 

A new scoring system was introduced for the season, with points now being handed to the top 15 finishers.

Drivers' Championship

References

External links 
 

STCC TCR Scandinavia Touring Car Championshopb
STCC TCR Scandinavia Touring Car Championship